Route 42 is a major arterial road located in Winnipeg, Manitoba.

It connects the suburbs of North Kildonan, East Kildonan, Fort Rouge, Fort Garry, and St. Norbert with the city's downtown core. In the north, it is a continuation of Manitoba Provincial Road 204 (PR 204); in the south, it is a continuation of PTH 75 (or Lord Selkirk Highway).

The route is commonly known as Pembina Highway between PTH 75 to Donald Street; as the Disraeli Freeway between Main Street and Talbot Avenue; and as Henderson Highway from Talbot to PR 204.

Route description

The route begins at PTH 75 and Turnbull Drive in the suburb of St. Norbert and, as Pembina Highway, crosses the Perimeter Highway South, and runs north-northwest through Fort Garry (passing by the University of Manitoba). 
At Confusion Corner, it takes the name Donald Street until it crosses the Assiniboine River at the Midtown Bridge, and splits into one-way streets where southbound traffic continues along Donald Street and northbound traffic follows Smith Street. 

At Notre Dame Avenue, it becomes King Street (northbound) and Princess Street (southbound) until it crosses Main Street and becomes the Disraeli Freeway, continuing northeast, passing through the neighbourhood of Point Douglas and crosses the Red River at the Disraeli Bridge, where it becomes Henderson Highway. Running north along the east bank of the Red River, it passes Hespeler Avenue and Chief Peguis Trail to Perimeter Highway North where it leaves the city as Provincial Road 204.

Disraeli Bridges 

Between Main Street and the south end of Henderson Highway, route 42 is known as the Disraeli Freeway, named after Benjamin Disraeli. The Freeway includes the Disraeli Bridges, which stretch over the Red River and are integral in connecting the City's downtown and northeastern areas.

Originally constructed in 1959/60, the Bridges were authorized for rehabilitation in 2008, and subsequently became Winnipeg's largest bridge project in history.

Construction of the new Disraeli Bridges began in January 2010 with a cost of $195 million, and a minimum of four lanes of the Bridges remained open the entire time. Funded through a Public-Private Partnership arrangement, the federal government provided $18.3 million (and an additional $53.3 m) for the infrastructure project, with Plenary Roads Winnipeg being chosen as the private consortium chosen to design, build, finance, and maintain the roadway.

Key features of the project included:

  of new roads for the Disraeli Freeway, between Main Street and Hespeler Avenue;
 new bridge structures to cross the Red River and Canadian Pacific mainline;
 reorganization and improvement of vehicular access and exit points; and
 revitalized landscaping and entrance points for adjacent communities.

The project was officially opened on 19 October 2012.

Names
The namesakes of the various roads making up Route 42 are as follows:
Pembina Highway, together with PTH 75, originated as the Pembina Trail, which was used by early settlers to travel between the Selkirk Settlement and Fort Pembina.
Donald and Smith Streets are named for the 1st Lord Strathcona.
King Street is named for John Mark King, a local clergyman.
Princess Street is named for Princess Louise, Duchess of Argyll.
Disraeli Freeway is named for Benjamin Disraeli.
Henderson Highway is named for early Manitoba pioneer Samuel Robert Henderson.

Major intersections

References

042